The 1997 NCAA Division II women's basketball tournament was the 16th annual tournament hosted by the NCAA to determine the national champion of Division II women's  collegiate basketball in the United States.

North Dakota defeated Southern Indiana in the championship game, 94–78, to claim the Fighting Sioux's first NCAA Division II national title. This would go on to be the first of three consecutive titles for North Dakota.

The championship rounds were contested in Grand Forks, North Dakota.

Regionals

East - Shippensburg, Pennsylvania
Location: Heiges Field House Host: Shippensburg University of Pennsylvania

Great Lakes - Marquette, Michigan
Location: Hedgcock Fieldhouse Host: Northern Michigan University

North Central - Fargo, North Dakota
Location: Bison Sports Arena Host: North Dakota State University

Northeast - Waltham, Massachusetts
Location: Dana Center Host: Bentley College

South - Melbourne, Florida
Location: Percy Hedgecock Gymnasium Host: Florida Institute of Technology

South Atlantic - Marietta, Georgia
Location: Owl's Nest Host: Kennesaw State University

South Central - St. Joseph, Missouri
Location: MWSC Fieldhouse Host: Missouri Western State College

West - Davis, California
Location: Recreation Hall Host: University of California, Davis

Elite Eight - Grand Forks, North Dakota
Location: Hyslop Sports Center Host: University of North Dakota

All-tournament team
 Jaime Pudenz, North Dakota
 Jenny Crouse, North Dakota
 Kelli Britz, North Dakota
 LeeAnn Freeland, Southern Indiana
 Eileen Weber, Southern Indiana
 Jennifer Gross, UC Davis

See also
 1997 NCAA Division II men's basketball tournament
 1997 NCAA Division I women's basketball tournament
 1997 NCAA Division III women's basketball tournament
 1997 NAIA Division I women's basketball tournament
 1997 NAIA Division II women's basketball tournament

References
 1997 NCAA Division II women's basketball tournament jonfmorse.com

 
NCAA Division II women's basketball tournament
1997 in North Dakota